A burl (American English) or burr (British English) is a tree growth in which the grain has grown in a deformed manner. It is commonly found in the form of a rounded outgrowth on a tree trunk or branch that is filled with small knots from dormant buds. Burl formation is typically a result of some form of stress such as an injury or a viral or fungal infection. 

Burls yield a very peculiar and highly figured wood sought after in woodworking, and some items may reach high prices on the wood market. Poaching of burl specimens and damaging the trees in the process poses a problem in some areas.

Description

A burl results from a tree undergoing some form of stress. It may be caused by an injury, virus or fungus. Most burls grow beneath the ground, attached to the roots as a type of malignancy that is generally not discovered until the tree dies or falls over. Such burls sometimes appear as groups of bulbous protrusions connected by a system of rope-like roots. Almost all burl wood is covered by bark, even if it is underground. Insect infestation and certain types of mold infestation are the most common causes of this condition.

In some tree species, burls can grow to great size. The world's second-largest burls can be found in Port McNeill, British Columbia. One of the largest burls known was found around 1984 in the small town of Tamworth, New South Wales. In January 2009, this burl was controversially removed from its original location, and relocated to a public school in the central New South Wales city of Dubbo.

Use

Burls yield a very peculiar and highly figured wood, prized for its beauty and rarity. It is sought after by furniture makers, artists, and wood sculptors. There are a number of well-known types of burls (each from a particular species); these are highly valued and sliced into veneers for furniture, inlay in doors, picture frames, household objects, automobile interior paneling and trim, musical instruments, and woodturning. 

The prized "" is not a species of a maple, but wood from a maple's burl (burr).
The famous birdseye maple of the sugar maple (Acer saccharum) superficially resembles burr maple, but it is something else entirely.
Burl wood is very hard to work with hand tools or on a lathe, because its grain is twisted and interlocked, causing it to chip and shatter unpredictably. This "wild grain" makes burl wood extremely dense and resistant to splitting, which made it valued for bowls, mallets, mauls and "beetles" or "beadles" for hammering chisels and driving wooden pegs.

Poaching

Because of the value of burls, ancient redwoods in national parks in the Western United States have recently been poached by thieves for their burls, including at Redwood National and State Parks. Poachers often cut off the burls from the sides of the trunks using chainsaws, which exposes the tree to infection and disease, or fell the entire tree to steal burls higher up. Because of the risk of poaching, Jeff Denny, the state park's redwood coast sector supervisor, encourages those buying burl to inquire where it came from and to ensure it was obtained legally. Legal acquisition methods for burl include trees from private land cleared for new development and from lumber companies with salvage permits.

Gallery

See also

 Canker
 Forest pathology
 Gall

References

Further reading

External links
Video footage of tree burrs

Antiques
Furniture
Trees
Wood